The Apostolic Vicariate of the Northern District was an ecclesiastical jurisdiction of the Roman Catholic Church in England and Wales. It was led by a vicar apostolic who was a titular bishop. The Apostolic Vicariate of the Northern District was created in 1688 and dissolved in 1850 and was replaced by the Diocese of Hexham, which changed to the Diocese of Hexham and Newcastle in 1861.

Background
Soon after the accession of Queen Elizabeth I, the bishops of England were forced to choose between taking the Oath of Supremacy, thus denying the authority of the Pope, and losing their episcopal sees. Those who chose to continue their allegiance to Rome were subsequently deposed and replaced in their sees by priests of the Church of England. Most of the deposed Bishops were imprisoned in various locations and died in captivity over a period of years, though some left the country and continued their work overseas. The last of the deposed bishops was Thomas Goldwell, Bishop of St Asaph, who died in Rome on 3 April 1585.

The Vicar Apostolic of England
The Vicars Apostolic were established in 1622 by the Congregation for the Propagation of Faith to provide a Roman Catholic Bishop with jurisdiction in England. So it was that Dr William Bishop was appointed, with the title of Vicar Apostolic of England. He died shortly afterwards and was succeeded by Dr Richard Smith, who in August 1631 was forced to resign and fled to France. The office then remained vacant until its revival in 1685 with the appointment of Dr John Leyburn as Vicar Apostolic and bishop.

Geographical Organisation
In 1623 the first Vicar Apostolic, Dr Bishop, divided England into six areas and placed a superior at the head of each with the title of vicar general. This structure remained in place until Dr Leyburn reduced the number from six to four. It was on the basis of these four areas that on 30 January 1688 Pope Innocent XI increased the number of bishops in England to a total of four. The territory of the former single Vicariate Apostolic was then reduced, becoming the Apostolic Vicariate of the London District. So it was that the Apostolic Vicariate of the Northern District was created, along with the Apostolic Vicariate of the Midland District and the Apostolic Vicariate of the Western District.

The Northern District consisted of the historic counties of Cheshire, Cumberland, Durham, Lancashire, Northumberland, Westmorland, and Yorkshire, plus the Isle of Man. The first Vicar Apostolic of the Northern District was Bishop James Smith, who died in 1711. He was succeeded in 1716, after an interregnum, by Bishop George Witham, hitherto Vicar Apostolic of the Midland District. In 1840, the Northern District lost roughly half of its territory on the creation of the Lancashire and Yorkshire districts. Despite intermittent persecution, an Apostolic Vicariate of the Northern District continued in existence until 1850.

List of vicars apostolic

Bishop of Hexham
The last Vicar Apostolic of the Northern District was Bishop William Hogarth, who on 30 September 1850 was assigned the title of bishop of Hexham. On the previous day, 29 September, Pope Pius IX had issued the Bull Universalis Ecclesiae, by which thirteen new dioceses were created, commonly known as the restoration of the English hierarchy, among them the diocese of Hexham, a new jurisdiction to replace formally the old Vicariate. In 1861 the diocese of Hexham was renamed the diocese of Hexham and Newcastle and its head took the title Bishop of Hexham and Newcastle, which has remained until the present day.

See also

 Catholic Church hierarchy
 Catholic Church in England and Wales
 Lists of patriarchs, archbishops, and bishops
 Roman Catholic bishops
 Roman Catholicism in England and Wales

References

Bibliography

 

History of Catholicism in England
Northern District (England)
Northern District (England)